Wang Jun is a Chinese football coach and a former professional player. In his playing career he was predominantly associated with his time for Tianjin Teda who he played for from 1991 until 1998 and was their top scorer in season 1995 when he scored ten league goals. Since his retirement in 1998 he would become an assistant coach of his old club Tianjin Teda.

Honours
Tianjin Teda
Jia B League: 1998

References

External links
Player profile at Sodasoccer.com

1966 births
Living people
Chinese footballers
Footballers from Tianjin
Tianjin Jinmen Tiger F.C. players
Association football midfielders
Association football forwards
Shandong Taishan F.C. non-playing staff
Association football coaches